Shamrock Bowl I was the first championship game played between two Irish American Football teams in the IAFL, the game was played in St Marys RFC Templeville road in Dublins southside. The Dublin Celts and Craigavon Cowboys met in a very rough and difficult contest for both teams, exacerbated by a high level of penalty flags thrown in the game, causing frustration to both sides. The Celts ran a mixture of the wishbone formation, and the pro set during the game but the Cowboys defence managed to prevent the Celts scoring a touchdown. The Celts were ahead for most of the game when they scored a safety by Carlos De la Garza early in the game. However, in the final quarter of the game Cowboys quarterback Geoff Donaghy passed to wide receiver John Mulally to score the only touchdown of the game. The Cowboys won 6-2, the lowest scoring Shamrock Bowl in the history of the league.

It was the same two teams who were to meet in Shamrock bowl 11, in North RFC in Belfast, this time the Dublin Celts emerged victorious in a tough hard hitting game, 25 to 15. at the end of the game both teams went back to the Cowboys clubhouse for a post-game celebration, such was the sportsmanship displayed by both teams, even after a tough grueling game.

Shamrock Bowl
1986 in American football
1986 in Irish sport